Shrek is an American media franchise made by DreamWorks Animation, loosely based on William Steig's 1990 picture book Shrek!. The series primarily focuses on Shrek, a bad-tempered but good-hearted ogre, who begrudgingly accepts a quest to rescue a princess, resulting in him finding friends and going on many subsequent adventures in a fairy tale world. It includes four computer-animated films: Shrek (2001), Shrek 2 (2004), Shrek the Third (2007), and Shrek Forever After (2010). A short 4-D film, Shrek 4-D, which originally was a theme park ride, was released in 2003. Two television specials, the Christmas television special Shrek the Halls (2007) and the Halloween television special Scared Shrekless (2010), have also been produced. Two spin-off films were made centered around the character Puss in Boots: 2011's Puss in Boots and it's sequel, 2022's The Last Wish. Additionally, a  stage musical adaptation was made and premiered at Broadway for more than a year.

In May 2010, The New York Times described the principal Shrek characters as "brilliantly realized" and said "nearly a decade after the first Shrek film they remain as vital and engaging fusions of image, personality and voice as any characters in the history of animation." The series was a financial success, becoming the 17th highest-grossing film franchise of all time and the second highest-grossing animated franchise.

Films

Main films

Shrek (2001)

Shrek, a solitary ogre, is angered when fairy tale creatures are sent to live in his swamp ordered by Lord Farquaad. He befriends a talking donkey named Donkey, and they set off to meet with Farquaad. 

The lord needs Princess Fiona to marry him so he will become the king of Duloc. When Shrek and Donkey visit him, they are forced to rescue her from an enormous fire-breathing Dragon in exchange for Shrek's swamp being vacated. The Dragon turns out to be female, and after a minute or two falls in love with Donkey.

Donkey, Shrek, and Fiona escape, and Dragon chases them. Once Shrek and Donkey rescue Fiona, they take her back to Lord Farquaad. Along the way, Shrek begins to fall in love with Fiona. Donkey finds out from Fiona that she is cursed and turns into an ogre at night. The only way the curse can be broken is by true love's first kiss. Fiona and Farquaad have a marriage ceremony, but they are interrupted by Shrek, who tells Fiona he loves her.

Donkey and Dragon enter, and Dragon eats Farquaad. Shrek and Fiona kiss and Fiona is permanently turned into an ogre. Shrek gets his swamp back, and the two marry there. After a karaoke party, the newlyweds set off on their honeymoon.

Shrek 2 (2004)

The second film opens with Prince Charming on a quest to rescue Princess Fiona from the Dragon. When he gets there, he finds the wolf from Little Red Riding Hood and The Three Little Pigs in Fiona's bed. He asks the wolf where Fiona is and the wolf tells him that she is on her honeymoon with Shrek. Once Shrek and Fiona return from their honeymoon, they find Donkey in the swamp who tells them he and Dragon are going through a rough patch. They then get invited to the land of Far Far Away by Fiona's parents who want to bless their marriage.

When they arrive, Shrek and Fiona are not what they expected. The Fairy Godmother and her son, Prince Charming, are trying to break up Shrek's marriage by making Fiona fall in love with Prince Charming. However it does not work and Shrek and Fiona stay together. Shrek and Donkey get a new sidekick called Puss in Boots. They have a lengthy quest to search the Fairy Godmother's cottage to get a love potion. Shrek and Donkey drink the potion and they become something quite unexpected. Shrek becomes human and Donkey becomes a horse. Since Shrek drank the potion, it also affected Fiona as she woke up to seeing her human form once again.

At the end of the film, King Harold reverts to a frog after being struck with the Fairy Godmother's magic, and gives Shrek and Fiona his blessing. After Fiona tells Shrek she loves him just the way he is, they revert to ogres.

Shrek the Third (2007)

Shrek and Fiona are reluctantly reigning over Far, Far Away during King Harold's prolonged illness. The King promises that if they can find Fiona's cousin Artie, he will make him the next in line, so both Shrek and Fiona would not have to run the country after his death. As Shrek, Donkey and Puss set off to find Artie, Fiona reveals she is pregnant.

Shrek is shocked as he believes he will not be a good father and will ruin his child's life. This is reinforced by his relationship with his own father, where "he tried to eat me." After finding Artie, Artie is frightened of being king, and they end up on an island where they meet Artie's former magic teacher, Merlin. Meanwhile, Charming plots to overthrow Artie and become king, but this is foiled by Shrek.

The film ends with Shrek and Fiona caring for their newborn ogre triplets.

Shrek Forever After (2010)

Shrek has become a domesticated family ogre, living happily with Princess Fiona and the triplets. Instead of scaring villagers away like he used to, a reluctant Shrek now agrees to autograph pitchforks. Longing for the days when he felt like a "real ogre", Shrek is tricked into signing a pact with the smooth-talking dealmaker Rumpelstiltskin. He agrees to trade a day from his childhood in exchange for a day to exist as a real ogre again. However, Shrek suddenly finds himself in a twisted, alternate reality where ogres are hunted, Rumplestiltskin is king, Puss is obese, and Shrek has never met Donkey or Fiona. Shrek discovers he unknowingly traded the day he was born and will not exist after the day is over.

Shrek becomes entangled with an underground resistance of ogres led by Fiona. Rumpelstiltskin places a bounty on Shrek's capture, offering the "deal of a lifetime" as a reward. The Pied Piper captures most of the resistance excluding Shrek and Fiona. Shrek, unable to win Fiona's affection, turns himself in and offers to trade his life to free the captured ogres. The recently released ogres go back to free Shrek and Fiona. As the twenty-four hours are almost up and Shrek lies dying, Fiona kisses him, breaking the deal and reverting everything back to normal. After finding himself back at his triplets' birthday party where he previously lost his temper and stormed out, Shrek joyfully reunites with his family and friends realizing he has everything he ever wanted.

Spin-offs

Puss in Boots (2011)

Puss in Boots is a computer-animated American action comedy film that was released on October 28, 2011. The film is based on and follows the character Puss in Boots on his adventures with Kitty Softpaws and mastermind Humpty Dumpty.

Puss in Boots: The Last Wish (2022)

Puss in Boots: The Last Wish is the sequel to Puss in Boots, that was released on December 21, 2022.

In November 2012, executive producer Guillermo del Toro said that a couple of drafts for a sequel were already done, and that the director Chris Miller wanted to take Puss on an adventure to exotic places. In April 2014, Antonio Banderas, the voice of Puss, said that the work on the sequel had just begun. On June 12, 2014, the movie was titled Puss in Boots 2: Nine Lives & 40 Thieves. On February 26, 2019, it was confirmed that the sequel was still in development, and Bob Persichetti was set to direct the film. In August 2020, the name Puss in Boots: The Last Wish had been trademarked by DreamWorks, revealing the new title of the sequel. In March 2021, Joel Crawford replaced Persichetti as director, having previously helmed DreamWorks' The Croods: A New Age. Puss in Boots: The Last Wish was theatrically released on December 21, 2022, by Universal Pictures. The film was originally scheduled to be released on November 2, 2018, but was delayed a month to December 21, 2018 before cancellation. It was also scheduled to be released on September 23, 2022. The story takes place after Shrek Forever After and follows Puss, who has burned all but the last of his nine lives, on a quest to find the mystical Last Wish in order to restore his nine lives.

Future

Possible fifth Shrek film 
Following the success of Shrek 2 in May 2004, Jeffrey Katzenberg revealed that the Shrek story had been outlined into five films almost from the beginning. "Before the first one was finished we talked about what the whole story of Shrek is, and each of the chapters answers questions about the first movie and gives us an insight," said Katzenberg. "Shrek 3 and 4 are going to reveal other unanswered questions and, finally, in the last chapter, we will understand how Shrek came to be in that swamp, when we meet him in the first movie." After the release of Shrek the Third in 2007, Katzenberg announced that the fifth film would be released in 2013.

In May 2009, DreamWorks Animation announced that the fourth film's title would be Shrek Forever After, indicating that it would be the last in the Shrek series. Later in 2009, that was confirmed by Bill Damaschke, head of creative production at DWA, with him saying: "All that was loved about Shrek in the first film is brought to the final film."

Josh Klausner, one of the writers of Shrek Forever After, explained in 2010 the script's evolution: "When I first came onto the project, it wasn't supposed to be the final chapter — there were originally going to be five Shrek movies. Then, about a year into the development, Jeffrey Katzenberg decided that the story that we'd come up with was the right way for Shrek's journey to end."

In February 2014, in an interview with Fox Business Network, Katzenberg hinted that a fifth film could still be made. "We like to let them have a little bit of time to rest," he said of the characters. "But I think you can be confident that we'll have another chapter in the Shrek series. We're not finished, and more importantly, neither is he."

On June 15, 2016, after NBCUniversal purchased DreamWorks Animation for $3.8 billion, NBCUniversal CEO Steve Burke discussed plans to continue the franchise, as well as other DreamWorks films. In July 2016, The Hollywood Reporter cited sources saying that the fifth film was planned for a 2019 release. In September 2016, Eddie Murphy confirmed that the film was expected to be released in 2019 or 2020, and that the script had been completed.

The story for the film was written by Michael McCullers, based on his own idea. When asked about the script in March 2017, McCullers said it featured "a pretty big reinvention" for the film series. On November 6, 2018, it was reported by Variety that Chris Meledandri had been tasked to be the executive producer of both Shrek 5 and Puss in Boots 2, with the cast of the previous films potentially returning.

Short films

Shrek in the Swamp Karaoke Dance Party (2001)
Shrek in the Swamp Karaoke Dance Party is a three-minute musical short film included on home media releases of Shrek. It takes place during the last scene of Shrek (before Shrek and Fiona leave on their honeymoon), with the film's characters performing a medley of modern pop songs.

Shrek 4-D (2003)

Shrek 4-D, also known as Shrek 3-D, Shrek 4D Adventure, Shrek's Never Before Seen Adventure, and The Ghost of Lord Farquaad, is a 4-D film/ride at various theme parks around the world. It premiered in 2003 at Universal Studios Florida, and was released on DVD. The short takes place right after the first Shrek film. Lord Farquaad returns from the dead to kidnap Princess Fiona and it is up to Shrek and Donkey to rescue her.

Far Far Away Idol (2004)
Far Far Away Idol is an interactive five-minute short, released on November 5, 2004 as an extra on the Shrek 2 DVD and VHS. It is based on American Idol and guest stars Simon Cowell. Taking place right after Shrek 2 ends, the film's supporting characters hold a singing competition, with Shrek, Fiona, and Simon Cowell as the judges.

Donkey's Caroling Christmas-tacular (2010)
Donkey’s Caroling Christmas-tacular (promoted as Donkey’s Christmas Shrektacular) is a five-minute short which was released on December 7, 2010, with the Shrek: The Whole Story box set and Shrek Forever After.

This short takes place in the Candy Apple, the new version of the Poison Apple. Donkey suggests everyone sing Christmas carols. Donkey sings "It's the Most Wonderful Time of the Year". Shrek, Fiona, the Ogre children, and the army of ogres sing an ogre version of "Jingle Bells" (such as "Bug Cocoon, Lick the spoon. Try our cricket slurp"). Puss in Boots sings "Feliz Navidad", although he titles it "Fleas Navidad". Then everyone sings "Jingle Bell Rock" as "Fairy Tale Rock".

Shrek's Yule Log (2010)
Shrek's Yule Log is a 30-minute short released on December 7, 2010, featured on both the Donkey's Christmas Shrektacular DVD and the Shrek Forever After Blu-ray.

The short takes place inside Shrek's house, with the fireplace as the only place seen throughout the entire short. Shrek prevents Rumpelstiltskin from dousing the fire, Donkey does the same eye gag (seen from Shrek Forever After), Fiona puts out cookies for Santa, and Puss puts on weight from cookies and cookie dough. Other characters such as Gingy, Pinocchio, the Three Little Pigs, Cookie, the Ogre Triplets, the Dronkeys, and Pied Piper appear.

Thriller Night (2011)
Thriller Night is a six-minute short film parody of Michael Jackson's music video Thriller. It was directed by Gary Trousdale, and released on September 13, 2011, on the Scared Shrekless DVD. It was released on DVD and Blu-ray on August 28, 2012, as a part of Shrek's Thrilling Tales (DreamWorks Spooky Stories).

Deceased characters such as Lord Farquaad, Mongo, Rumpelstiltskin, Fifi, Fairy Godmother, Prince Charming and King Harold in his frog form appear as zombies. A 3D version of the short was added in October 2011 to the Nintendo Video service for Nintendo 3DS owners.

The Pig Who Cried Werewolf (2011)
The Pig Who Cried Werewolf is a six-minute 3D Halloween short film, directed by Gary Trousdale and released on October 4, 2011, for a limited time, exclusively on the Nintendo Video service on Nintendo 3DS. It was released on DVD and Blu-ray on August 28, 2012, as a part of Shrek's Thrilling Tales (DreamWorks Spooky Stories).

The Three Little Pigs find themselves in trouble when they ignore the warning signs of a new neighbor moving in next door who takes on a ferocious form during a full moon.

Puss in Boots: The Three Diablos (2012)

Puss in Boots: The Three Diablos is a 13-minute CGI animated short film, directed by Raman Hui, and was released on the DVD and Blu-ray releases of Puss in Boots on February 24, 2012. The short tells a story of Puss in Boots on a mission to recover a princess's stolen ruby from the notorious French thief, the Whisperer. Reluctantly accompanied by three little kittens, The Three Diablos, Puss must tame them before they endanger the mission.

Puss in Boots: The Trident (2023) 
Puss in Boots: The Trident is a 4-minute CGI animated short film, directed by Matt Flynn, and was released on digital release on February 21, 2023 and on 4K, Blu-ray, and DVD on February 28.

Television and interactive specials

Shrek the Halls (2007)

Shrek the Halls is a 22-minute Christmas-themed television special, set after the events of Shrek the Third but before the events of Shrek Forever After. It follows Shrek, who has never celebrated Christmas before, attempting to make the perfect day for his family. It premiered on the American television network ABC on  November 28, 2007.

Scared Shrekless (2010)

Scared Shrekless is a 21-minute Halloween-themed television special set after the events of Shrek Forever After. Shrek challenges Donkey, Puss in Boots, and his other fairy tale friends to spend the night in Lord Farquaad's haunted castle, telling scary stories to see who can resist becoming scared and stay the longest. The special premiered on the American television network NBC on October 28, 2010.

Puss in Book: Trapped in an Epic Tale (2017)

Puss in Book: Trapped in an Epic Tale is an interactive special developed by DreamWorks Animation Television which debuted on Netflix in 2017, featuring the character Puss in Boots. It is Netflix's first attempt at interactive television: during the program, the viewer is given points while using their remote control or other device to decide how the narrative should proceed.

Television series

The Adventures of Puss in Boots (2015–2018)

A television series, starring Puss from the Shrek franchise, debuted on Netflix on January 16, 2015.

Production
Despite the advances in computing power over the 2000s decade, the increasing usage of novel techniques like global illumination, physics simulation, and 3D demanded ever more CPU hours to render the films. DreamWorks Animation noticed that every Shrek film took roughly twice the CPU hours than the previous film and thus labeled this trend as "Shrek's law". Similar to "Moore's law" the Shrek's law says, "The CPU render hours needed to complete production on a theatrical sequel will double compared to the amount of time needed on the previous film."

In 2001, Shrek required approximately 5 million CPU render hours. In 2004, Shrek 2 required over 10 million CPU render hours. In 2007, Shrek the Third required over 20 million CPU render hours, and the 2010 3D release of Shrek Forever After demanded more than 50 million CPU render hours on account of rendering an increased amount of frames. Puss in Boots, which was released only one year after the previous Shrek film, utilized 63 million render hours.

Reception

Box office performance

Critical and public response

Academy Awards

Cast and characters

Crew

Video games

 Shrek
 Shrek: Hassle at the Castle
 Shrek: Extra Large
 Shrek: Super Party
 Shrek 2
 Shrek SuperSlam
 Shrek Smash n' Crash Racing
 Shrek the Third
 Shrek n' Roll
 Madagascar Kartz
 Shrek Forever After
 DreamWorks Super Star Kartz

Musical

Shrek the Musical is a musical based on the first film of the franchise. After a try out in Seattle, Washington, it began performances on Broadway from November 8, 2008, before opening on December 14. Despite mixed reviews, the musical received eight Tony Award nominations including Best Musical. At the time, the most expensive musical on Broadway ran for over a year and closed, at a loss, on January 3, 2010, after 478 performances.

A re-imagined version of the show ran as a tour of the United States from July 2010 to July 2011. The second tour launched under two months later. A West End production opened in London, United Kingdom in June 2011, to positive reviews. It received five Laurence Olivier Award nominations including Best New Musical. A differently staged production ran in Israel in 2010, with international productions running since 2011 in Poland and Spain, and since 2012 in France. The show was soon to premiere in Brazil, Italy, Australia, and  Philippines in 2012.

The title role was played by Brian d'Arcy James on Broadway, and Nigel Lindsay on the West End. Other notable performances include Amanda Holden (West End), Sutton Foster (Broadway) and Kimberley Walsh (West End) as Princess Fiona, Christopher Sieber (Broadway) and Nigel Harman (West End) as Lord Farquaad, and John Tartaglia (Broadway) as Pinocchio.

Comics
Dark Horse Comics released in 2003 three thirty-two-page full-color comic books featuring Shrek, Donkey and Fiona, Shrek #1, Shrek #2, and Shrek #3. The comics were written by Mark Evanier and illustrated by Ramon Bachs and Raul Fernandez.

Ape Entertainment has also released under the KiZoic label five full-color comic books, a fifty-two-page prequel to Shrek Forever After titled Shrek (2010), and four thirty-two-page books: Shrek #1 (2010), Shrek #2 (2010), Shrek #3 (2011), and Shrek #4 (2011).

Attractions
Far Far Away is one of the seven themed lands in Universal Studios Singapore, and it consists of many locations from the Shrek franchise, including the forty-meter-tall Far Far Away Castle.

Shrek's Faire Faire Away is one of the three areas at the DreamWorks Experience-themed land at the Australian theme park Dreamworld. It opened in 2012 and it consists of a fixed arm, rotating plane ride Dronkey Flyers, a kite flyer Gingy's Glider, a swing ride Puss in Boots Sword Swing and a carousel Shrek's Ogre-Go-Round.

A Shrek-themed attraction, called DreamWork's Tours Shrek's Adventure! London, opened in 2015 at London County Hall as the first of six attractions initially planned over nine years. This "Immersive Tunnel" from Simworx is built in collaboration with Merlin Entertainments. The  live interactive walkthrough adventure presents an original story written by DWA, along with a character courtyard, also featuring characters from several other DreamWorks Animation's franchises.

Multiple Shrek Water attractions opened at  DreamWorks Water Park on October 1 2020, these attractions are called Far Far a Bay Wavepool, Forbidden Waters Hot Tubs, Dragon and Donkey's Flight, Swamp & Splash, Shrek's Sinkhole Slammer. Dreamworks Waterpark also includes themed decorations that are  balloons of Shrek and Donkey hanging from the ceiling of the waterpark.

Internet fandom

An underground fandom of the Shrek film series emerged on the internet. With the fanbase described by some as having an ironic liking towards the series, there have been several sexually explicit memes based on the titular character. The most notable example is a 2013 metameme based on a fanmade video called "Shrek is love, Shrek is life". Fans of Shrek are known as "Brogres", a take on the name "Bronies", the fans of the show My Little Pony: Friendship is Magic outside of the shows intended audience. A "Shrek Filmmaker" movement of Source Filmmaker animators making videos based on the internet's obsession towards the character has also occurred.

Since 2014, Madison, Wisconsin has celebrated the annual Shrekfest with costume and onion-eating contests, themed merchandise, and other festivities. In November 2018, comedy group 3GI, organizer of Shrekfest, released a shot-for-shot parody remake of the film Shrek made by a crew of over 200 artists, titled Shrek Retold.

References

External links
 

 
Mass media franchises introduced in 1990
Adventure film series
Animated film series
Comedy film franchises
DreamWorks Animation franchises
Fantasy film franchises
Film and television memes
Film series introduced in 2001
Children's film series